The 2004 Arab Junior Athletics Championships was the eleventh edition of the international athletics competition for under-20 athletes from Arab countries. It took place in Damascus, Syria – the fourth time that the city hosted the tournament. A total of 43 athletics events were contested, 22 for men and 21 for women. The 2002 medal table leader, Morocco, was absent from the tournament.

Sudan topped the table for the first time with eight gold medals. Egypt was a close second with seven titles. Qatar were third with six gold medals, all in the men's side. A minority of track finals had times recorded only to a tenth of a second due to technical restrictions. Junior implements were used in the men's throwing events for a second edition running, setting the standard for future events.

On the men's side Antar Zerguelaïne won a middle-distance double, Nagmeldin Ali Abubakr was a double sprint medallist and Aymen Ben Ahmed took the hurdles gold medal. All three went on to win senior medals at African level. Long jumper Saleh Al-Haddad was a clear winner and took multiple Asian medals as a senior. Gretta Taslakian emerged on the women's side, breaking new ground for Lebanon by winning a sprint double – also her country's first individual gold medals at the competition. Sudanese trio Muna Jabir Adam, Hind Roko Musa and Nawal El Jack won eight individual medals between them in the track events – all would make an impact as seniors at the Pan Arab Games.

Medal summary

Men

Women

Medal table

References

Arab Junior Athletics Championships
International athletics competitions hosted by Syria
Sport in Damascus
Arab Junior Athletics Championships
Arab Junior Athletics Championships
21st century in Damascus
2004 in youth sport